Thoms Run is a  long 2nd order tributary to Chartiers Creek in Allegheny County, Pennsylvania.

Course
Thoms Run rises about 0.25 miles north of Beechmont, Pennsylvania and then flows southeasterly to join Chartiers Creek at Presto.

Watershed
Thoms Run drains  of area, receives about 38.4 in/year of precipitation, has a wetness index of 308.49, and is about 43% forested.

See also
 List of rivers of Pennsylvania

References

Rivers of Pennsylvania
Rivers of Allegheny County, Pennsylvania